The Betrothed (Italian:I promessi sposi)  is a 1923 Italian silent historical drama film directed by Mario Bonnard and starring Domenico Serra, Nini Dinelli and Emilia Vidali. It is an adaptation of the 1827 novel The Betrothed by Alessandro Manzoni.

Plot
Lake Como: Renzo and Lucia are two farmers who are in love. But the cruel and despotic Don Rodrigo impairs their marriage because he is secretly in love with Lucia. The two have to flee from their Lombard village, and shelter by different routes: Renzo goes to Milan and Lucia in a convent in Monza. Even the plague of 1600 contributes to the prolongation of the separation of the two lovers, who eventually find themselves in a hospital in Milan.

Cast
 Emilia Vidali as Lucia
 Domenico Serra as Renzo
 Ninì Dinelli as la monaca di Monza
 Mario Parpagnoli as Don Rodrigo
 Rodolfo Badaloni as l'Innominato
 Umberto Scalpellini as Don Abbondio
 Ida Carloni Talli as Agnese
 Raimondo Van Riel as il Griso
 Olga Capri as Perpetua
 Enzo Biliotti as frà Cristoforo
 Bonaventura Ibáñez

References

Bibliography 
 Buonanno, Milly. Italian TV Drama and Beyond: Stories from the Soil, Stories from the Sea. Intellect Books, 2012.

External links 
 

1920s historical drama films
Italian historical drama films
Italian silent feature films
1920s Italian-language films
Films based on works by Alessandro Manzoni
Films directed by Mario Bonnard
Films set in Italy
Films set in the 1620s
Films set in the 1630s
Films based on Italian novels
1923 films
Italian black-and-white films
1923 drama films
Silent historical drama films
1920s Italian films